Alan Gifford Miller (born November 6, 1969) is the former Speaker of the New York City Council who represented the 5th district. Barred from seeking reelection due to term limits, the Democrat ran unsuccessfully in the Democratic primary for the opportunity to run against incumbent Republican Mayor, Michael Bloomberg in November 2005.

Early life and education

Miller grew up in New York City with mother Lynden B. Miller, a prominent landscape designer, and father Leigh Miller, who was a political appointee to Presidents Kennedy and Johnson.

Miller attended St. Bernard's School, a Manhattan day school for young boys. He graduated from Middlesex School and Princeton University, earning a degree in political science. Following his graduation from Princeton in 1992, Miller joined the staff of Representative Carolyn B. Maloney, a Democrat who represents the New York 14th Congressional District, which overlaps Council District 5. Council District 5 represents of the Upper East Side, Yorkville, Carnegie Hill, Turtle Bay, Sutton Place and Roosevelt Island.

Miller dropped out of Fordham University Law School in 2000 to focus on his successful race for the New York City Council Speaker.

Career
On January 9, 1996, Miller won his first term in the New York City Council at the age of 26. He was the first Democrat in recent history elected to represent the traditionally wealthy district. He easily won reelection in 1997, 2001 and 2003; term limits laws prohibited him from seeking a fifth term. Following a unanimous election on January 9, 2002, Miller succeeded Peter Vallone, Sr. to become the second Speaker of the New York City Council.

Under Miller’s leadership the Council passed new laws to protect children from lead-paint poisoning, expanded civil rights, strengthened the City's campaign finance system and established tax credits to encourage greater energy savings and cleaner air.

Miller led the Council in enacting some of the most sweeping changes in land use policy in the City's history. Miller set a new standard for affordable housing requirements as part of land use applications, broadening the use of inclusionary zoning. Miller pushed through historic rezonings for Manhattan's Far West Side and Chelsea districts and the Williamsburg-Greenpoint area.

Miller helped lead the City’s response to the fiscal crisis that followed the September 11 attacks. Faced with a $7.5 billion budget gap, Miller approved more than $3 billion in budget cuts overall, while protecting critical public safety and emergency services.

Miller sought the Democratic mayoral nomination in 2005. His opponents for the nomination included former Bronx borough president Fernando Ferrer, Congressman Anthony D. Weiner and outgoing Manhattan borough president C. Virginia Fields. The winner of the Democratic primary election on September 13, 2005 was Ferrer, who was easily defeated by Republican mayor Michael Bloomberg in the general election held on November 8, 2005.

Miller was, according to a New York Magazine article, barraged by local media, and politicos. Some claimed that Miller lacked the "ethnic base" necessary to be a successful politician in New York City-wide elections. According to the New York Observer, Miller is "widely regarded as a decent and talented man" who has nonetheless shown "signs of immaturity: his reversal on lead-paint legislation after pressure from special interests; his eagerness to spend the city budget surplus to hire teachers, reopen firehouses and cut taxes despite an ongoing climate of fiscal uncertainty".

Although Miller had the most money of any of the candidates in the Democratic field, as well as many key endorsements, he suffered severe reversals of fortune in the final month of the primary. He failed to get backing from much of the entrenched local Democratic Party machinery.  A news report concerning his voter-information mailings was released close to the primary election date. It was alleged that Gifford's aides initially originally stated the mailings cost only $37,000, but later stated they cost taxpayers $1.6 million (which was well within the average of mailing costs for City Council members). $37,000 would have been by far the lowest of all City Council members. While Miller's aide disputed that the figure $37,000 was ever offered, it had already been run as a news story during the election week. Miller also held that his $1.5 million of his fund was exempt from the primary's $5.7 million spending limit as it was self-financed which caused a spat with the New York City Campaign Finance Board. While Miller vigorously maintained his position, he ended the dispute by canceling over $500,000 in important final stage advertisements, negating his spending edge.  Miller saw much of his potential support drift to Congressman Anthony Weiner. In the end, Miller placed fourth in the primary field with 10.19%.

In the fall of 2006, Miller was a teacher at New York University's College of Arts and Science, leading a Freshman Honors Seminar, entitled "Governing Gotham" on public policy and urban planning in New York City. He also runs a strategic consulting firm, Miller Strategies, and a real estate investment firm. Miller serves on the board of a hedge fund and numerous non-profit groups, including Friends of the High Line, NYC Outward Bound and the New York Academy of Medicine.

Personal life
He lives in Manhattan with his wife, Pamela Addison, and their two sons, Marshall Legend and Addison Lad. and he is a great Liverpool fan.

References

External links
Hu, Winnie, For Ex-Council Speaker, Few Regrets and a New Role as N.Y.U. Public Figure, New York Times, February 26, 2006
Hu, Winnie, The Missteps That Hampered Miller, New York Times, September 15, 2005
 New York crooner aims for office, BBC News, May 11, 2005

Sources
Confessore, Nicholas, That's Entertainment? No, It's Politics, New York Times, May 11, 2005

1969 births
Living people
New York City Council members
New York (state) Democrats
New York University faculty
People from Manhattan
Princeton University alumni
Speakers of the New York City Council
St. Bernard's School alumni
Middlesex School alumni
Fordham University School of Law alumni